Joan Taylor known as Joanie (née O’Neill) is a fictional character in The Catherine Tate Show, referred to mainly as "Nan".  She is one of the main characters of the show and is portrayed by Catherine Tate. She has since gone on to be the main character of a number of specials. In 2022, she starred as the main character in the movie entitled The Nan Movie, featuring Matthew Horne reprising his role as her on-screen grandson Jamie from the original sketch series.

Character history

The Catherine Tate Show
Joanie is most often referred to as "Nan". She is an obnoxious cockney woman in her seventies who frequently swears at and criticises other people. She is often visited by her well-mannered grandson, Jamie (Mathew Horne), whom she refers to when visitors come "'e ain't got a job", even though Jamie is in fact at university. His visits usually start off well enough, with Nan showing how grateful she is that he has come to see her. However, the situation usually takes a turn for the worse after she starts to make unfavourable comments about her neighbours, family, or home help visitors. Nan is mostly very pleasant to visitors, but after they leave, she harshly criticises and rants about them. Sketches in series one show Jamie taking her to a pound shop, which ends with shambolic consequences. Joanie complains to her grandson about her home help visitor, whom she refers to as a "fucking thief". She also calls her new great-grandchild ugly. Her catchphrase, delivered at the crucial point of each sketch, is "What a fucking liberty!"

In series two, Nan spends less time in her flat. She makes a disastrous visit to the doctor and spends two weeks in hospital. True to form, she does not suffer in silence, complaining about her fellow patients, accusing a nurse of stealing from her and caustically surveying the food menu. While in hospital, her grandson brings his first girlfriend to visit her. Unfortunately, his girlfriend has an abnormally large nose, provoking Nan's insulting behaviour as she becomes fixated with it, even offering her some old bed sheets to use for tissues. Another sketch sees Joanie arrive home from her friend Lena's funeral, where she is very upset, until she realises that the deceased actually owed her £15. She quickly gets over her grief and is overcome with rage, coupled by the fact she had spent another £25 on a wreath, and it is then revealed she had stolen food from the wake. In the last episode of Series 2, Peter Kay guest stars as one of Nan's friends who thinks Jamie is gay and describes it as a disability. In the 2005 Christmas special, a sketch features Nan attending a Christmas party in an old people's care home. Charlotte Church makes a guest appearance as herself, where she starts to sing a Christmas song for the guests, which prompts Nan to exclaim, "What a load of ole' shit!"

In series three, Leslie Phillips plays another of Nan's friends, who is himself very much like her, evident when he says "What a fucking liberty" after Nan visits him in hospital and leaves him a present which he did not like, she had also used the phrase after receiving the same gift, which she re-gifted. Dame Sheila Hancock appears as Nan's sister June, who lives in Spain and is equally as foul-mouthed as Nan. They reveal that most of their family were London gangland career criminals and mass murderers, with nicknames such as "Clownface", "Wallopnuts" and "Longsocks". Nan also made a characteristic appearance on The Paul O'Grady Show, in which she was pleased to discover his show had bought her a new armchair, but soon got annoyed when she learned that they had entered her house without her permission to deliver it, upon which she stormed off the set, exclaiming "Paul O'Grady? What a load of old shit!" Nan has at least one daughter, Diane, who is the mother of Jamie and a granddaughter, Gail, who bore Nan's "ugly" great-grandchild, Francesca. She initially believes the child to have been named Tesco's. The Christmas 2007 special introduced us to Diane herself, played by Kathy Burke, who was exactly like Nan in that she swore at and criticised people behind their backs. The sketch ends with both of them saying "What a fucking liberty!" together.

Charity sketches
In a sketch made especially for Comic Relief 2007, Nan appears on the game show, Deal or No Deal, hosted by Noel Edmonds. In the sketch, Nan plays a game of Deal or No Deal, in which she uncovers the five highest amounts of money in the first five boxes. As the boxes are opened, she makes an offensive comment about the player opening it, targeting their weight, earrings, and glasses. Being given an offer of £199 by the Banker, Nan accepts the offer happily, having already cheated and looked in her box and found that it only contained £50. Later in 2007, she did a Sport Relief sketch, about the World Cup. In 2010, she appeared on Comic Relief, receiving a cheque for her local community centre. Nan has also appeared in Holby City's hospital, because of her ingrown toenail, a 2013 Children in Need sketch.

Nan's Christmas Carol

Catherine Tate's Nan

See also
List of The Catherine Tate Show characters and sketches

References

Female characters in television
Female characters in film
Fictional people from London
Fictional bullies
The Catherine Tate Show characters
Television characters introduced in 2004